Ptilodactylidae is a family of beetles belonging to the Elateriformia. There around 500 extant species in 35 genera. They are generally associated with riparian and aquatic habitats. The larvae generally live associated with rotting wood or vegetation, or within gravel and detritus on the edge of water bodies. The larvae of some species feed on submerged rotting wood or on plant roots, while the adults of some species are known to feed on fungus with modified brush-like maxillae.

Genera
Subfamily Anchytarsinae Champion, 1897
 Anchycteis Horn, 1880
 Anchytarsus Guérin-Méneville, 1843
 Byrrocryptus Broun, 1893
 Epilichas White, 1859
 Pseudoepilichas Armstrong & Nakane, 1956
†Electrolichas Alekseev & Jäch 2016 Baltic amber, Eocene
Subfamily Cladotominae Pic, 1914
 Austrolichus Lawrence & Stribling, 1992
 Cladotoma Westwood, 1837
 Drupeus Lewis, 1895
 Hovactyla Fairmaire, 1901
 Paralichus White, 1859
 Pseudocladotoma Pic, 1918
Subfamily Apoglossinae Champion, 1897
 Apoglossa Guérin-Méneville, 1843
 Bradytoma Guérin-Méneville, 1849
 Octoglossa Guérin-Méneville, 1843
Subfamily Araeopidiinae Lawrence, 1991
 Araeopidius Cockerell, 1906
Subfamily Ptilodactylinae Laporte, 1836
 Chelonariomorphus Pic, 1916
 Daemon Laporte, 1836
 Falsotherius Pic, 1913
 Lachnodactyla Champion, 1897
 Microdrupeus Nakane, 1993
 Pherocladus Fairmaire, 1881
 Podabrocephalus Pic, 1913
 Ptilodactyla Illiger, 1807
 Stirophora Champion, 1897
Subfamily Unplaced
 Aphebodactyla Chatzimanolis, Cashion, Engel, & Falin, 2012
 Falsoptilodactyla Pic, 1958
 Ptilodactyloides Motschulsky, 1856
 Therius Guérin-Méneville, 1849
 Valoka Deleve, 1872
†Aphebodactyla Chatzimanolis et al. 2012 Burmese amber, Myanmar, Cenomanian
†Ptilodactyloides Motschulsky 1856 Baltic amber, Eocene

References

Further reading

 
 
 
 
 
 
 
 
 
 
 

Byrrhoidea
Beetle families